Ljiljana Petrović (1939 – 4 February 2020) was a Serbian singer. She was born in Bosanski Brod, but was brought up in Novi Sad. She began to sing at local clubs and restaurants, and performed at a festival in Mali Lošinj in 1960, where she was noticed by the head of the artists and repertoire division at the record label Jugoton. In 1961, Petrović represented Yugoslavia in the Eurovision Song Contest 1961 with the song "Neke davne zvezde" (Some ancient stars). Petrović finished in 8th place receiving 9 points. Subsequently, she continued to record music until the late 1970s, at which point she retired from public life until the late 1980s, when she became an author, releasing a book of poetry in 1991. 

Petrović died on 4 February 2020, aged 81.

See also 
 Gabi Novak

References

External links

1939 births
2020 deaths
Yugoslav women singers
Eurovision Song Contest entrants of 1961
Eurovision Song Contest entrants for Yugoslavia
People from Brod, Bosnia and Herzegovina
Musicians from Novi Sad
Serbs of Bosnia and Herzegovina